The following lists the events of the 1930 Philadelphia Phillies season.

The Phillies tallied 1,783 hits, the most ever recorded by a team during a major league season. They recorded a .315 team batting average during the season, which was second in the National League and major league baseball. Only the 1930 New York Giants who batted .319 and the 1921 Detroit Tigers at .316 posted higher team averages in the modern era (since 1901).

However, their pitching is why the Phillies finished in last place. The pitching staff allowed 1,199 runs in 156 games (2 games ended in a tie), an average of 7.69 runs per game. 1,024 of those runs were earned runs, their team earned run average of 6.71 is the highest in the modern era.

Regular season

Season standings

Record vs. opponents

Roster

Player stats

Batting

Starters by position 
Note: Pos = Position; G = Games played; AB = At bats; H = Hits; Avg. = Batting average; HR = Home runs; RBI = Runs batted in

Other batters 
Note: G = Games played; AB = At bats; H = Hits; Avg. = Batting average; HR = Home runs; RBI = Runs batted in

Pitching

Starting pitchers 
Note: G = Games pitched; IP = Innings pitched; W = Wins; L = Losses; ERA = Earned run average; SO = Strikeouts

Other pitchers 
Note: G = Games pitched; IP = Innings pitched; W = Wins; L = Losses; ERA = Earned run average; SO = Strikeouts

Relief pitchers 
Note: G = Games pitched; W = Wins; L = Losses; SV = Saves; ERA = Earned run average; SO = Strikeouts

Notes

References 
1930 Philadelphia Phillies season at Baseball Reference

Philadelphia Phillies seasons
Philadelphia Phillies season
Philly